Luca Magnino (born 13 August 1997) is an Italian professional footballer who plays as a central midfielder for  club Modena.

Club career
He was raised in the youth system of Udinese. In early January 2017, he was called up to Udinese's senior team for a Serie A game, but remained on the bench. Shortly after, he was loaned to Serie C club Casertana for the rest of the 2016–17 season.

In July 2017, he moved to Serie C club Feralpisalò, where he played regularly for the next three seasons.

On 6 February 2020, his hometown club Pordenone announced that Magnino had signed a three-year contract that would become active from the following season. He made his Serie B debut for Pordenone on 26 September 2020, starting in a game against Lecce. Magnino played regularly during his first season at Pordenone, with his convincing performances eventually gaining him a contract extension until 2025.

On 24 January 2022, he joined Modena on loan with an option (and a conditional obligation) to buy.

References

External links
 

1997 births
Living people
People from Pordenone
Footballers from Friuli Venezia Giulia
Italian footballers
Association football midfielders
Serie B players
Serie C players
Udinese Calcio players
Casertana F.C. players
FeralpiSalò players
Pordenone Calcio players
Modena F.C. players